Chase Williamson (born July 7, 1988) is an American actor and film producer. He is best known for portraying David Wong in John Dies at the End (2012).

Early life 
Williamson was born in Coral Springs, Florida, in 1988. When he was young, he moved from Coral Springs to San Diego, then moved again to Texas. During his high school tenure, Williamson participated in "speech tournaments", where he would act against other competitors. These experiences caused him to pursue acting as a profession.

As he had been performing in theater for most of his life, he attended the University of Southern California's theater school, with the intent of becoming a professional stage actor.

He is openly gay.

Career 
One of Williamson's initial auditions in the first weeks after graduating from USC was for the role of David in John Dies at the End, a role he won; it was his first professional film. The film premiered at the 2012 Sundance Film Festival, and co-stars Rob Mayes, Clancy Brown, and Paul Giamatti. Later that year, he portrayed Moritz in Spring Awakening, a stage musical. His performance was well received by critics, with some calling him the standout performer.

In 2013, he played the title role in Sparks, a superhero noir film based on the graphic novel of the same name. The film reunited Williamson with Brown, and also stars Ashley Bell, William Katt, Jake Busey, and Clint Howard. After its premiere at the 2013 Cinequest Film Festival, the film was released digitally and straight to DVD on March 18, 2014. The same year, he joined the cast of Video Game High School in its second season. He portrays Shane Pizza, one of the show's antagonists. He also co-starred in The Guest, along with Dan Stevens. The film premiered at the 2014 Sundance Film Festival.

Filmography

Film

Television

Web series

Music video 
 Neon Indian - Slumlord Rising (2015) as Informant Jogger

References

External links 
 
 

1988 births
Living people
American male film actors
Film producers from California
Male actors from Florida
American gay actors
USC School of Dramatic Arts alumni
21st-century American male actors
People from Coral Springs, Florida
Male actors from San Diego
Male actors from Texas
Film producers from Florida